Franciscus Josefus van Vree (1807–1861) was the first bishop of Haarlem after the re-establishment of Catholic dioceses in the Netherlands in 1853, and the third since the original founding of the bishopric in the 16th century.

Life
Van Vree was born in Rhenoy, Gelderland, on 8 February 1807. After training as a priest and receiving ordination, he was sent to the junior seminary in Katwijk (established 1831) where he taught classical languages from 1836 to 1838, when he became headmaster. In 1842 the school was transferred to the Society of Jesus and Van Vree was appointed president of the Major Seminary in Warmond. He also founded and edited a monthly magazine, De Katholiek.

When the diocese of Haarlem was refounded on 4 March 1853, along with four other Dutch dioceses, Van Vree was appointed bishop. He took possession of the see on 22 April 1853, and was consecrated by Archbishop Johannes Zwijsen on 15 May 1853. Of the five new bishops appointed, he was the only one who had not already received episcopal consecration. In 1857 he made an ad limina visit to Rome, where he was ceremonially appointed to the household of Pope Pius IX. Van Vree died suddenly in 1861 at the age of 53, having served as bishop for eight years.

References

1807 births
1861 deaths
People from Gelderland
19th-century Roman Catholic bishops in the Netherlands